The Greek Basket League Pentad, Greek Basket League Pentada, or Greek Basket League Best Five, is an annual award for the 5 best players of each season of Greece's top-tier level professional basketball club league, the Greek Basket League.

Greek Basket League Pentad by season

2003–04 season

2004–05 season

2005–06 season

2006–07 season

2007–08 season

2008–09 season

2009–10 season

2010–11 season

2011–12 season

2012–13 season

2013–14 season

2014–15 season

2015–16 season

2016–17 season

2017–18 season

2018–19 season

2020–21 season

2021–22 season

Players with multiple Pentad selections
The following table only lists players with at least two total selections.

References

External links
 Official Greek Basket League Site 
 Official Greek Basket League YouTube Channel 
 Official Hellenic Basketball Federation Site 
 Basketblog.gr 
 GreekBasketball.gr 

Greek Basket League
Pentad
European basketball awards